The Eden Prairie Center is a mall located in Eden Prairie, Minnesota. It has been managed by Jones Lang LaSalle as of 2020. It is anchored by JCPenney, Kohl's, Target, Von Maur and Scheels Sporting Goods.

History

The 1970s and 1980s
The mall was developed in 1976 by Homart Development Company and originally had wood and glass railings and an overall off-white and brown theme. The pillars in the mall were made of white pebbles. There was no elevator in the mall and originally the mall featured a large ramp for access to the second floor by wheelchair. The mall was designed with a sunken basement-level foodcourt. The mall featured the department stores Powers Dry Goods and Sears. Powers' store became Donaldson's in 1985, then Carson Pirie Scott in 1987. In 1984, a Target store was constructed adjacent to the mall and connected by a walkway.

The 1990s
The mall underwent a major renovation and the color scheme was changed to a pink and aqua pastel theme. The white pebble pillars were covered with pastel aqua round casings. The ramp was removed and replaced with a free standing elevator. The glass and wood railings were replaced with aqua painted metal. The food court was decorated with large neon palm trees and given a fountain that changed colors.

In preparation of a $60 million renovation plan in 1996, the mall worked hard to lure premiere Minneapolis retailer Dayton's; and it appeared to be a plan Dayton's was considering, though they eventually decided against it.

The Carson Pirie Scott store became a Mervyns, and work began on adding a Kohl's department store. A second United Artists movie theater was built, called "Eden Prairie East" and the old theater located beneath the Target walkway was renamed "Eden Prairie West". The mall entrances at this time had large white pyramids. In June 1997, General Growth purchased the rest of the development that it did not already own from Homart.

Present day

The mall underwent the most major renovation in 2001. A new wing was added to the mall and the floor plan changed considerably to make the mall more modern and upscale. The food court was moved out of the recessed basement, which has been sealed in and now serves as the mall offices and other offices, changing the mall's store layout from a three-story mall to two stories. A large AMC movie theater was added to the mall and the two United Artists theatres have closed. The Target expanded into a Target Greatland and connected to the mall, replacing the old walkway. A Von Maur department store was added to the mall in August 2001, the mall entrance utilizing space that had been smaller mall stores near the old food court area. The mall has a simplified stylized "EP" logo to replace the older handwritten style logo, and the pastel theme disappeared in favor of wood and stonework. After the Mervyns store closed in August 2004, the owner of the mall acquired the store. Department Store Discounters had a brief stay in the Mervyn's location in 2005. JCPenney opened a new store in the former Mervyn's location in March 2007. The current department stores in the mall are JCPenney, Kohl's, Target, and Von Maur. In October 2013, General Growth Properties sold the mall to Cypress Equities for $99 million. Sears closed in 2016. 75% of the original building was demolished and a 248,000 sq/ft Scheels All Sports opened in July 2020. On June 4, 2020, it was announced that JCPenney would be closing as part of a plan to close 154 stores nationwide. However that store was removed from the closing list and will remain open for now.

Anchors History Timeline

1976-1985
Powers Dry Goods, Sears

1985-1987
Donaldson's, Sears, Target

1987-1994
Carson Pirie Scott, Sears, Target

1994-1995
Carson Pirie Scott, Kohls, Sears, Target

1995-2001
Kohls, Mervyns, Sears, Target

2001-2004
Kohls, Mervyns, Sears, Target Greatland, Von Maur

2004-2007
Kohls, Sears, Target Greatland, Von Maur

2007-2011
JCPenney, Kohls, Sears, Target Greatland, Von Maur

2011-2016
JCPenney, Kohls, Sears, Target, Von Maur

2016-2020
JCPenney, Kohls, Target, Von Maur

2020-present
JCPenney, Kohls, Scheels Sporting Goods, Target, Von Maur

Film appearances
 The Kevin Smith movie Mallrats was filmed inside the Eden Prairie Center Mall in 1995. Smith decided to film the movie at the mall (which in the movie, is referred to by its actual name, but is supposed to be located in New Jersey) after various malls (including the Monmouth Mall in Eatontown, New Jersey, and the now closed Bannister Mall in Kansas City, Missouri) objected to content in the film, and refused to allow the production to be shot there. 
 The mockumentary Drop Dead Gorgeous has a scene filmed in the parking lot of the Eden Prairie Center, when they are allegedly parking in the parking lot of the nearby Mall of America; one of the 1990s era pyramid entrances is clearly visible in the background.
 The mall reappears in Kevin Smith's Jay and Silent Bob Reboot. Brodie Bruce relocated his comic book store, Brodie's Secret Stash, at the mall due to the low cost on rent, giving in his belief that malls are dying.

References

External links
 The Eden Prairie Center homepage
 The city of Eden Prairie

Eden Prairie, Minnesota
Shopping malls in Hennepin County, Minnesota
Shopping malls established in 1976
1976 establishments in Minnesota